Publicis Groupe is a French multinational advertising and public relations company. One of the oldest and largest marketing and communications companies in the world by revenue, it is headquartered in Paris.

After 1945, the little-known Paris-based advertising agency grew rapidly, becoming the world's fourth-largest agency.  It was a leader in promoting France's post-war economic boom, especially the expansion of the advertising industry; it was successful because of its close ties with top officials of the French government, its clever use of symbols to promote itself, and its ability to attract clients from widely diverse growing industries.

It is one of the "Big Four" agency companies, alongside WPP, Interpublic and Omnicom. Publicis Groupe S.A. is headed by Arthur Sadoun, and its agencies provide digital and traditional advertising, media services and marketing services (SAMS) to national and multinational clients.

History
The company was founded by 20 year old Marcel Bleustein-Blanchet in 1926.

In 2011, Publicis was named the third-largest marketing group worldwide by revenue, surpassing Interpublic. By the end of 2010, the twin sectors of digital activities and high-growth emerging countries represented one-half of Publicis Groupe's total revenue.

The group had operations in over 202 cities in 105 countries, including a strategic alliance with Dentsu.

In July 2012 it was announced that Publicis Groupe and Omnicom Group would merge to form Publicis Omnicom Group, but by May 2014 it was announced that the deal had fallen through and the Publicis-Omnicom merger would not happen.

In February 2015, Publicis acquired Sapient Corporation to form Publicis.Sapient as the world's largest digital network, which at the time included SapientNitro, Sapient Consulting, DigitasLBI and RazorfishGlobal.

In September 2015 The Publicis Groupe acquired South African marketing, promotions and activations agency The Creative Counsel.  The acquisition was reported as the largest agency buyout ever to happen in South Africa, with an unconfirmed valuation of between R1bn and R1.5bn.

In December 2015, Publicis announced a new organisation into four main divisions:
 Publicis Communications (gathering creative networks Leo Burnett Worldwide, Publicis Worldwide, Saatchi & Saatchi, Bartle Bogle Hegarty (BBH), global design and technology consultancy Nurun, and creative production group Prodigious Brand Logistics and global PR agency MSLGROUP) under the leadership of Arthur Sadoun; 
 Publicis Media (gathering the media planning and buying capabilities of Starcom Mediavest Group and ZenithOptimedia) under the leadership of Steve King; 
 Publicis.Sapient (gathering technology and digital agencies Razorfish, DigitasLBi and Sapient Corporation) under the leadership of Alan Herrick; 
 Publicis Healthcare, already in existence, will remain under the leadership of Nick Colucci.

In addition, Laura Desmond became Chief Revenue Officer, leading a team of 20 Chief Client Officers who would lead client teams across all Publicis Groupe entities. The new organisation was to be effective 1 January 2016.

Since 2016, Publicis has co-organised, with Groupe Les Echos, the annual technology conference, Viva Technology.

In 2017, CEO Maurice Lévy replaced Elisabeth Badinter (Bleustein-Blanchet's daughter) as chairman of the supervisory board and was succeeded as CEO by Arthur Sadoun.

On 21 January 2019, Publicis announced the deal to sell two of their Latinamerican agencies, NovaDigitas and Pixeldigital to BancroftX to form a new marketing firm under the group umbrella BancroftX.

On 14 April 2019, Publicis announced a $4.4 billion deal to acquire data marketing firm Epsilon.

On 4 February 2020, Publicis Groupe India announced the merging of existing agencies – Arc Worldwide, Solutions and Ecosys OOH, to create 'Publicis In-Motion'. In January 2014, Publicis acquired Law & Kenneth, an Indian advertising and digital agency.

On 3 May 2022 French advertising holding company Publicis Groupe acquired Profitero, an e-commerce software company that provides analytics for brands, as marketer clients are increasingly seeking services in commerce.

On September 2022 Publicis Groupe brings home Vietnam’s only Effie Award in 2022 with ‘Keep Stories Alive’.

Operations
The company owns several full-service advertising groups that undertake a range of media activities: mobile and interactive online communication, television, magazines & newspapers, cinema and radio, outdoor. The company's SAMS services include direct marketing/customer relationship management services, sales promotion, healthcare communications, multicultural and ethnic communications, corporate and financial communications, human resource infrastructure, public relations, design services, interactive communications, events marketing and management, sports marketing, and production and pre-press services. Its media services include media planning, media buying, and media sales. Publicis Groupe's Vivaki developed a technological platform supported by Microsoft, Google, Yahoo! and AOL Platform A technologies that offers advertisers the possibility to target specifically defined audiences in a single campaign across multiple networks.

Controversies

Qorvis, a U.S. subsidiary of Publicis, has represented the country of Saudi Arabia since the September 11 attacks and has been accused of helping to whitewash its record on human rights. More recently, the writer Ken Klippenstein obtained leaked documents from Qorvis, which show the PR company pitched a private company on a four to five minute propaganda video, which hoped to improve the reputation of its Homestead, Florida shelter for "unaccompanied alien children".

Subsidiaries

As of October 2015, the main subsidiary companies of this group are:

Publicis Communications
Bartle Bogle Hegarty (BBH)
Glickman Shamir Samsonov
Leo Burnett Worldwide
Publicis New York
Publicis Worldwide
Publicis India
Publicis Beehive
Digitas
Saatchi & Saatchi
Epsilon
Publicis Media
Starcom
Zenith
Frubis
Spark Foundry
Digitas
GroupeConnect
Blue 449
Performics
Publicis Global Delivery (PGD)
Publicis Sport & Entertainment
Saatchi & Saatchi
Publicis Sapient
3SHARE
SapientRazorfish
Rosetta
Publicis Pixelpark
Publicis Sapient
Vertiba
vivaki
Publicis Health
Specialized Agencies
Médias & Régies
PMCI (content and innovation)
 LionVault (Web3 Specialist Group)
MSLGROUP
Prodigious Brand Logistics
 Translate Plus Limited (The Publicis Language Services)
Publicis Healthcare Communications Group
The Creative Counsel

PublicisLive
PublicisLive is a global event management and strategic communication firm founded in 1995 and has offices in Abu Dhabi, Dubai, Geneva, Istanbul, Kigali and Paris. PublicisLive is part of  Publicis Groupe.

References

Further reading
 Clark Hultquist, "Publicis and the French advertising world, 1946--1968" Essays in Economic & Business History (2009) 27: 61-76

External links

Official website: Nurun

1926 establishments in France
Advertising agencies of France
Holding companies established in 1926
CAC 40
Companies listed on Euronext Paris
Holding companies of France
Public relations companies